Daniel – Der Zauberer (translated: Daniel – The Wizard) is a German biographical musical drama film written and directed by Ulli Lommel, starring pop singer Daniel Küblböck as himself. The film was a box-office bomb, was panned by critics and has been considered one of the worst films of all time.

Plot
The successful singer Daniel Küblböck is (according to the film's tagline) "loved by millions, hated by many". Teenagers Rike and Tom decide to kill Daniel. They are encouraged, albeit not directly supported, by the mysterious Baltazar. Daniel is in turn spiritually supported by his dead grandfather Johnny who appears to him in visions, typically carrying a baritone horn and a wand and wearing a cap under his top hat, and who sometimes only has one arm, sometimes two.

The first attempt on Daniel's life fails when the teenagers are discovered and scared away by Daniel's vocal coach. Daniel is supposed to take part in a screen test for Hollywood. Meanwhile, Johnny and Baltazar, representing the forces of good and evil battling over Daniel's fate, talk with each other. As a warning, Johnny briefly changes Baltazar into a cockroach. After Baltazar says the words "I’m a celebrity, get me out of here!", Johnny transforms him back into a human.

A young girl named Petra visits Daniel. She is a fan of his and has previously written him a letter. Petra works at a café owned by her grandfather (Grandpa Winter) in Daniel's hometown of Eggenfelden. Grandpa Winter can't stand Daniel's music and neither can the café guests. Daniel sticks his finger into each cake on the counter and tastes them all, then buys them and gives Petra and her grandfather two free tickets for his last concert of the year in Passau.

Rike and Tom plan to shoot Daniel on stage at this concert. But instead, Rike kidnaps Daniel and brings him to their house. Tom arrives shortly afterward, after Baltazar again appears to him and encourages him to kill Daniel. Tom and Rike plan to film their execution of Daniel in order to become celebrities themselves. When Daniel is briefly left alone, his grandfather appears to him and emboldens him, warning him that he is about to face his toughest trial to date. Rike and Tom return and are unable to make themselves go through with the plan to kill Daniel – instead beginning to talk about their unhappy childhoods. Tom even confesses that he thinks Daniel's latest hit song isn't bad. Rike leaves, and Tom agrees to release Daniel again on the condition that Daniel doesn't report the kidnap. Daniel returns to his interrupted concert and continues to delight the crowd, including Petra and her grandfather, who has now become a fan of Daniel's and is dancing happily.

In the evening, Johnny appears to Daniel again. As Daniel asks whether he will receive a Christmas gift in return for overcoming his ordeal, Johnny says to him that he forgot to give Rike and Tom anything for Christmas, saying that he should give them something special to him - his new guitar. At first, Daniel is skeptical of the idea of giving his guitar to the people who tried to kill him but then goes to Rike and Tom's house with the guitar as a surprise. They are delighted, and Daniel, Rike, and Tom - now seemingly the best of friends - play around with the guitar in the snowy garden, to the song "I Like The Skin I'm In".

Johnny and Baltazar meet again. Baltazar says to him that while Johnny has won this fight, the struggle between them isn't over yet. Johnny reveals to Baltazar that he has passed his magic wand on to Daniel, and the two debate whether Daniel will be able to handle his newly gained magical powers.

Returning home, Daniel finds the wand under the Christmas tree, with a note saying: "From the one-armed man". Daniel's grandma tells him that her husband only had one arm. She met him at Oktoberfest, where he was working as a musician and she as a waitress. She shows Daniel a picture of him, and Daniel says that he has appeared to him several times. Daniel's grandma tells him that he must only use the wand to help people.

Daniel goes to bed and falls asleep clutching the wand, dreaming of the red carpet premiere of his film and of performing in concert. But the dream turns into a nightmare, and Daniel imagines negative tabloid headlines swirling and Baltazar stabbing him in his bed. Waking with a start, he again sees his grandfather, who tells him he has no need to be afraid. Daniel gets up, goes to church, prays, and lights a candle. The film closes with concert footage of Daniel dancing, to the song "My Life Is Magic".

Cast
 Daniel Küblböck as D.K.
 Ulli Lommel as Johannes "Johnny" Küblböck (Daniel's grandpa)
 Peter Schamoni as Grandpa Winter
  as Baltazar
 Günther Küblböck as himself (Daniel's father)
 Marina Lommel as Petra
 Manolito Lommel as Daniel at age six
  as Grandma Küblböck
 Adele Eden as Rike
 Oliver Möller as Tom
 Roger Fritz as film producer from Hollywood
 Günther Ziegler as vocal coach

Style
Director Ulli Lommel stated that he wanted to make a film that shows young people how to deal with frustration and hate without getting into the eternal cycle of hate and counter hate. In his opinion, the understanding between the old and the young people and the mutual trust plays an important role in it and so he decided to shoot the film with an intergenerational cast. The cast features experienced actors like Lommel, Schamoni, Brem, and Rupé; young actors like Eden and Möller; and also lay actors like Küblböck. All scenes were filmed spontaneously.

The film includes many references to Küblböck's real life: For example, when Daniel has a nightmare in the film, a scene from his appearance in the reality TV show "Ich bin ein Star – Holt mich hier raus!" is displayed, in which he had to lie in a coffin full of cockroaches. Headlines about Daniel Küblböck in the tabloid newspaper Bild are also shown (one refers to Küblböck's car accident with a truck).

Ulli Lommel tried to find an explanation for the controversy about Daniel Küblböck in Germany:

The film contains four songs by Daniel Küblböck:
 "Teenage Tears" (peaked at #16 on the German singles chart)
 "My Life Is Magic"
 "Man in the Moon"
 "The Skin I'm In"

Distribution
Daniel – Der Zauberer was released in Germany on 12 August 2004, and was watched by 13,834 viewers in total. Most cinemas removed the film from their programme after the first week, because of the low number of attendees. On 30 September 2005 the film was released on DVD (available in Germany and Austria only).

Reception
The film was universally panned and is considered one of the worst films ever made. The website filmstarts.de states that Daniel - Der Zauberer was "unbearable for non-fans of Küblböck", "the performances of the actors were some of the worst in the history of German cinema" and that Ulli Lommel and producer Peter Schamoni "damaged their reputation." Another critic from the website filmzentrale.de described Daniel Küblböck as a hero of the recent German trash culture. He wrote that the film is staged like an Off-Off-Broadway play. Everything in this film had the touch of the half-finished, temporary and uncertain and therefore it would be loveable. Küblböck would cultivate the lowbrow through to the camp, he'd present the beautiful sentimentality and the great kitsch.

The film also performed extremely poorly at the box office, drawing only 13.834 viewers altogether, which led to it being withdrawn from screening at cinemas within the first week.

It became the lowest ranked film on the IMDb Bottom 100, where it remained for a considerable amount of time, and wieistderfilm.de stated it was fair to call it the worst German film ever made.  It appeared on Total Film's list of the 66 worst films of all time. In an interview conducted several years after its release Daniel Küblböck admitted that in retrospect "You have to say this is the worst movie of all time really." However, he took the film's failure with humor and in later years even joked about it. In a 2013 talk show, he said that it was voted the worst film of all time and ironically said "Not everyone achieves that."

See also
 List of films considered the worst

References

External links
 

Films about music and musicians
German avant-garde and experimental films
German biographical films
Films directed by Ulli Lommel
German independent films
2004 films
2000s avant-garde and experimental films
2004 independent films
2000s German films